Taeniotes cayennensis is a species of beetle in the family Cerambycidae. It was described by James Thomson in 1859. It is known from French Guiana and Brazil.

References

cayennensis
Beetles described in 1859